Fantasia on a Theme by Thomas Tallis, also known as the Tallis Fantasia, is a one-movement work for string orchestra by Ralph Vaughan Williams. The theme is by the 16th-century English composer Thomas Tallis. The Fantasia was first performed at Gloucester Cathedral as part of the 1910 Three Choirs Festival, and has entered the orchestral repertoire, with frequent concert performances and recordings by conductors and orchestras of various countries.

Background and first performance
Vaughan Williams did not achieve wide recognition early in his career as a composer, but by 1910, in his late thirties, he was gaining a reputation. In that year the Three Choirs Festival commissioned a work from him, to be premiered in Gloucester Cathedral; this represented a considerable boost to his standing. He composed what his biographer James Day calls "unquestionably the first work by Vaughan Williams that is recognizably and unmistakably his and no one else's". It is based on a tune by the 16th-century English composer Thomas Tallis, which Vaughan Williams had come across while editing the English Hymnal, published in 1906.
Vaughan Williams conducted the London Symphony Orchestra in the first performance of the Fantasia, as the first part of a concert in Gloucester Cathedral on 6 September 1910, followed by Elgar's The Dream of Gerontius, conducted by its composer.

Music

Theme

Like several other of Vaughan Williams's works, the Fantasia draws on the music of the English Renaissance. Tallis's tune is in the Phrygian mode, characterised by intervals of a flat second, third, sixth and seventh; the pattern is reproduced by playing the white notes of the piano starting on E.

Tallis's theme was one of nine tunes he wrote for the Psalter of 1567 of the Archbishop of Canterbury, Matthew Parker. It was a setting of Parker's metrical version of Psalm 2, which in the King James Bible version begins, "Why do the heathen rage, and the people imagine a vain thing?", and is rendered by Parker as "Why fumeth in sight: The Gentils spite, In fury raging stout? Why taketh in hond: the people fond, Vayne things to bring about?". The tune is in Double Common Metre (D.C.M. or C.M.D.).

According to his biographer Michael Kennedy, Vaughan Williams came to associate Tallis's theme with John Bunyan's Christian allegory, The Pilgrim's Progress, a subject with which the composer had a lifelong fascination; he used the tune in 1906 in incidental music he composed for a stage version of the book. For the Hymnal, he adapted the tune as a setting of Joseph Addison's hymn "When rising from the bed of death".

Fantasia
The term "fantasia", according to Frank Howes in his study of Vaughan Williams's works, referred to the 16th-century forerunner of the fugue "in that a thread of theme was enunciated and taken up by other parts, then dropped in favour of another akin to it which was similarly treated". Vaughan Williams's fantasia draws on but does not strictly follow this precept, containing sections in which the material is interrelated, although with little wholly imitative writing, and antiphony in preference to contrapuntal echoing of themes.

The Fantasia is scored for double string orchestra with string quartet, employing antiphony between the three contributory ensembles. Orchestra I is the main body of strings; Orchestra II is smaller. The published score does not stipulate the number of players in Orchestra I; Orchestra II consists of two first violins, two seconds, two violas, two cellos and one double bass The composer's metronome marking indicates a playing time of 11½ minutes, but in recorded performances the duration has varied between 12m 40s (Dmitri Mitropoulos, 1958) and 18m 12s (Leonard Bernstein, 1976), with a more typical time of between 15 and 16½ minutes.

The piece begins in B-flat major in  time, with all three groups playing together, ppp molto sostenuto. Kennedy describes the opening as "the theme … first hinted at on pizzicato lower strings in a hauntingly poetic introduction before we hear its first full statement in Tallis's four-part harmonisation". From the ninth bar the two orchestras together continue into a  section, marked largamente. Howes comments that "a phrase of swaying chords" after the initial statement of the theme "acts as a kind of recurrent refrain" throughout the main body of the piece. The music switches to C major, with the time signature (but not the pulse of the music) changing rapidly, and solo viola, first heard above the orchestras and then solo in a più animato passage. The other three members of the quartet join, followed by the two orchestras, now playing different parts from each other, also piu animato. The music moves poco a poco animando to a crescendo to fortissimo. The quartet and orchestra 1 play together, contrasting with orchestra 2 in a  fortissimo passage. After two more changes of time signature there is a molto adagio section, after which the music reverts to the original time and key. There is a sudden hush, and, in Howes's analysis, "by way of coda the solo violin soars [and] the work ends on a chord of G major".
Kennedy observes:

Vaughan Williams revised the work twice: first in January 1913 (for the first London performance), and then again in April 1919, making it  more concise each time, taking a total of about two minutes off the original 1910 playing time.

Reception
The premiere of the Fantasia received a generally warm welcome, with a few exceptions: Herbert Brewer, the Gloucester cathedral organist, described it as "a queer, mad work by an odd fellow from Chelsea". The Musical Times reviewer said, "It is a grave work, exhibiting power and much charm of the contemplative kind, but it appears over long for the subject-matter". Other reviews were more enthusiastic. The reviewer in The Daily Telegraph praised Vaughan Williams's mastery of string effect and added that although the work might not appeal to some because of its "seeming austerity", it was "extremely beautiful to such as have ears for the best music of all ages". In The Manchester Guardian, Samuel Langford wrote, "The melody is modal and antique in flavour, while the harmonies are as exotic as those of Debussy … The work marks out the composer as one who has got quite out of the ruts of the commonplace". In The Times, J. A. Fuller Maitland also commented on ancient and Debussian echoes, and observed:

In 1954 Howes wrote:

Listeners of the British classical music radio station Classic FM have regularly voted the piece into the top five of the station's "Hall of Fame", an annual poll of the most popular classical music works.

Recordings
Although the BBC first broadcast the Fantasia in 1926, and again over the following decade, conducted by the composer and Arturo Toscanini, it was not until 1936 that the work was recorded for the gramophone. The fledgling Decca company recorded it with Boyd Neel conducting his orchestra under the supervision of the composer in January 1936, a set described by The Gramophone as one of the outstanding records of the year. Since then there have been more than fifty recordings by orchestras and conductors from various countries.

Notes, references and sources

Notes

References

Sources

Books

Journals

Further reading

See also
 List of variations on a theme by another composer

External links
 Score and parts from IMSLP
 

Compositions by Ralph Vaughan Williams
Compositions for string orchestra
1910 compositions
1913 compositions
1919 compositions
Vaughanwilliams
Thomas Tallis
Composer tributes (classical music)